James Chandler may refer to:

James Chandler (academic) (born 1948), American professor
James B. Chandler (1837–1899), American sailor
James Gilbert Chandler (1856–1924), American architect
James Watson Chandler (1801–1870), Canadian politician